The 2019 Tirreno–Adriatico was a road cycling stage race, that took place between 13 and 19 March 2019 in Italy. It was the 54th edition of Tirreno–Adriatico and the seventh race of the 2019 UCI World Tour.

Teams
The 18 UCI WorldTeams were automatically invited to the race. In addition five second-tier UCI Continental Circuits received a wildcard invitation to participate in the event.

The teams entering the race were:

UCI WorldTeams

 
 
 
 
 
 
 
 
 
 
 
 
 
 
 
 
 
 

UCI Professional Continental teams

Route

Stages

Stage 1
13 March 2019 — Lido di Camaiore to Lido di Camaiore, team time trial (TTT)

Stage 2
14 March 2019 – Camaiore to Pomarance,

Stage 3
15 March 2019 – Pomarance to Foligno,

Stage 4
16 March 2019 – Foligno to Fossombrone,

Stage 5
17 March 2019 — Colli al Metauro to Recanati,

Stage 6
18 March 2019 — Matelica to Jesi,

Stage 7
19 March 2019 — San Benedetto del Tronto to San Benedetto del Tronto, individual time trial (ITT)

Classification leadership table
In the 2019 Tirreno–Adriatico, four jerseys were awarded. The general classification was calculated by adding each cyclist's finishing times on each stage. Time bonuses were awarded to the first three finishers on all stages except for the time trials: the stage winner won a ten-second bonus, with six and four seconds for the second and third riders respectively. Bonus seconds were also awarded to the first three riders at intermediate sprints; three seconds for the winner of the sprint, two seconds for the rider in second and one second for the rider in third. The leader of the general classification received a blue jersey. This classification was considered the most important of the 2019 Tirreno–Adriatico, and the winner of the classification was considered the winner of the race.

The second classification was the points classification. Riders were awarded points for finishing in the top ten in a stage. Unlike in the points classification in the Tour de France, the winners of all stages – with the exception of the team time trial, which awarded no points towards the classification – were awarded the same number of points. Points were also won in intermediate sprints; five points for crossing the sprint line first, three points for second place, two for third and one for fourth. The leader of the points classification was awarded an orange jersey.

There was also a mountains classification, for which points were awarded for reaching the top of a climb before other riders. Each of the sixteen climbs was categorised as either Superior-, or single-category, with more points available for the more difficult, Superior-category climb to Sassotetto. For this climb, the top seven riders earned points; on the other climbs, only the top four riders earned points. The leadership of the mountains classification was marked by a green jersey.

The fourth jersey represented the young rider classification, marked by a white jersey. Only riders born after 1 January 1994 were eligible; the young rider best placed in the general classification was the leader of the young rider classification. There was also a classification for teams, in which the times of the best three cyclists in a team on each stage were added together; the leading team at the end of the race was the team with the lowest cumulative time.

Final classification standings

General classification

Points classification

Mountains classification

Young rider classification

Teams classification

References

Sources

 

2019
2019 UCI World Tour
2019 in Italian sport
March 2019 sports events in Italy